is a Japanese video game developer and publisher founded by former Data East employees in October 1994. A division of the company makes otome games under the name of Otomate. An international branch, Idea Factory International, was opened in California in 2013.

Games published

Games developed

References

External links
 Official site (Japanese)
 Idea Factory International 

Video game companies of Japan
Video game development companies
Video game publishers
Video game companies established in 1994
Software companies based in Tokyo
Japanese companies established in 1994